George Ward may refer to:

Sportspeople
 G. B. Ward (1878–1942), American college football player and coach
 George Ward (canoeist) (1932–2008), Canadian Olympic canoer
 George Ward (footballer, born 1877) (1877–1921), Australian rules football player for Essendon
 George Ward (footballer, born 1889) (1889–1928), Australian rules football player for Richmond
 George Ward (English footballer), English football player
 George Ward (footballer, born 1908), see 1931–32 Rochdale A.F.C. season
 George Ward (rugby union) (1885–1962), English rugby union player
 George S. Ward (1867–1940), vice president of the Brooklyn Federal League Baseball Club

Politicians
George Ward, 1st Viscount Ward of Witley (1907–1988), British Conservative Party politician
George Ward (Liberal politician) (1878–1951), Member of Parliament for Bosworth
George B. Ward (1867–1940), mayor of Birmingham, Alabama
George Taliaferro Ward (1810–1862), cotton plantation owner and politician from Leon County, Florida
George F. Ward (born 1945), former United States Ambassador to Namibia

Others
Cherry Valentine (1993–2022), English drag queen
George Ward (luthier) (died ), Irish luthier
George Ward (priest) (1862–1946), Archdeacon of Wisbech
George Hull Ward (1826–1863), soldier and Union officer in the American Civil War
George W. Ward (1867–1932), principal of Maryland State Normal School (now Towson University)
George Ward (1933–2012), co-owner of Grunwick Film Processing Laboratories during the 1976–78 Grunwick dispute
George Ward (died 1901), lynched by a white mob in Terre Haute, Indiana

See also
George Warde (1725–1803), British Army officer